Panghrun is a 2022 Indian Marathi-language period  musical drama film directed by Mahesh Manjrekar and produced by Zee Studios. The film was theatrically released on 4 February 2022 in Maharashtra. Panghrun is a winner of The Best Indian Cinema Award (2020), awarded by Bangalore International Film Festival.

Plot 
This story is set at the time of India's independence in 1947, during which time freedom for women in India was still unattainable. There were few customs in those days, the society had to struggle long to accept widow remarriage or prevent underage girls from marrying in the first place. Lakshmi (Gauri Ingawale), a widowed woman who is skilled in classical music, is forced to marry a man twice her age who is a kirtankar. He has two children from his previous wife. Lakshmi falls in love with Guruji through the daily routine of life.  But Guruji stays away to keep some illusions at bay.

Cast 
 Gauri Ingawale as Laxmi
 Amol Bavadekar as Guruji
 Rohit Phalke as Madhav 
 Medha Manjrekar as Janaki
 Pravin Tarde as Khot 
 Sulekha Talwalkar as Radhakka
 Deepti Lele as Kunda
 Vidhyadhar Joshi as Ramnath

Production

Development 
After the huge success of Kaksparsh (2012) and Natsamrat (2016), Manjrekar started producing Pangrun in 2017, inspired from B.B. Borkar's short-story.

Filming 
Panghrun was shot in Konkan region and other locations of Maharashtra.

Reception

Critical reception  
Panghrun received Positive reviews from critics. Preeti Atulkar of The Times of India gave 4 out 5 and praised sharp screenplay as well as strong storyline that shows women's sexual desires in unabashed manner. She also praised Gauri Ingwale's expressions and powerful performance in the film. The Business head of Zee Studios Mangesh Kulkarni said ''On the occasion of this film, the audience will get to experience a unique love story.  Mahesh Manjrekar has brought musical treasures to the audience along with a great plot. The songs of the film are also becoming a special favorite of the audience.  So we are very excited along with the audience about the performance of 'Panghrun'.''

Soundtrack

Release 
The teaser of Panghrun was released on 11 February 2022 and trailer on 24 January 2022.

Initially the film was set to release on 3 April 2020 after that the film was released on 4 February 2022 in theaters.

References

External links 
 Panghrun at IMDb

2022 films
2020s Marathi-language films
Indian historical drama films
Indian musical drama films